Light bending may refer to:
gravitational lensing, when light is "bent" around a massive object
refraction, a change in direction of a wave due to a change in its speed